Munther Al-Nakhli (born 13 February 1998) is a Saudi Arabian footballer who plays as a winger for Al-Arabi.

Career

Al-Fateh
Al-Nakhli started his career at Al-Nomoor Academy in Medina. On 28 May 2014, Al-Nakhli won the Prince of Football Tournament in Saudi Arabia which allegedly granted him a scholarship to Liverpool. However, this was proven to be false and nothing was materialized. He joined Al-Fateh's academy in 2015.

On 23 December 2017, Al-Nakhli made his professional debut for Al-Fateh against Al-Ahli in the Pro League, replacing Ali Al-Zaqaan. On 22 August 2019, Al-Nakhli signed his first professional contract with Al-Fateh keeping him at the club until 2022.

Al-Fayha (loan)
On 7 October 2020, Al-Nakhli signed with Al-Fayha on loan from Al-Fateh.

Al-Arabi
On 15 July 2022, Al-Nakhli joined First Division League side Al-Arabi on a free transfer.

Career statistics

Club

References

External links
 

1998 births
Living people
Saudi Arabian footballers
Association football midfielders
Association football wingers
Saudi Professional League players
Saudi First Division League players
Al-Fateh SC players
Al-Fayha FC players
Al-Arabi SC (Saudi Arabia) players
Saudi Arabia youth international footballers
People from Medina
Saudi Arabian Shia Muslims